Mohammed Ahmed Al-Omran (born October 10, 1994) is a Saudi football player who plays as a goalkeeper.

References

External links 
 

1994 births
Living people
Saudi Arabian footballers
Hajer FC players
Saudi Professional League players
Saudi First Division League players
Association football goalkeepers
Saudi Arabian Shia Muslims